The Ingonyama Trust is a corporate entity established to administer the land traditionally owned by the Zulu people, represented by their king, for the benefit, material welfare and social well-being of the Zulu nation, who continue to occupy the land as they historically have done. The Trust owns 29.67% of the land in KwaZulu-Natal, which is equivalent to 28,000 square kilometres, or 10,811 square miles.

The Board of the Trust consists of the Zulu King, MisuZulu Zulu kaZwelithini, who chairs the Board, and eight members appointed by the Minister of Rural Development and Land Reform in the national government, after consultation with the King, the Premier of KwaZulu-Natal and the chairperson of the KwaZulu-Natal House of Traditional Leaders.

The Trust was formed by an Act of the legislature of the then self-governing territory (Bantustan) of KwaZulu, as a last attempt at controlling previously black-owned land at a convenient arms-length, in the dying days of the era of segregation. Ingonyama means leopard in Zulu. Controversially, the Trust, as a former state institution, was exempt from paying tax from April 1994 to July 2005, until this position was challenged in a case considered by the Supreme Court of Appeal. Since this time, the Trust, and the occupants of the formal townships under its control, pay taxes and rates as per the wider national laws.

The Trust, and the greater question of land ownership and occupancy, remains a contested topic in South African discourse and law.

On 9 and 10 December 2020, a case against the Trust brought by the Council for Advancement of the South African Constitution, the Rural Women’s Movement and several communities started in Pietermaritzburg High Court in front of three judges.

External links
 http://www.ingonyamatrust.org.za website of the Ingonyama Trust Board

References

Real estate investment trusts
Politics of South Africa
Zulu topics
Zulu monarchy